M Harunur Rashid (born 28 December 1939) is a distinguished teacher of English literature and language, a notable educational administrator, editor and translator of modern poetry and prose, in Bangladesh, a noted writer of Sufism and Sufi literature and a commentator of social, political, cultural scene and literary texts.

Early life and education
Rashid was born on 28 December 1939, to a Bengali Muslim family in Tinsukia district, Assam Province in British Raj on 28 December 1939. On the eve of the Second World War, his father Rahimuddin Ahmed, an employee of the Assam Bengal Railway, was transferred to Chittagong. He spent his early childhood in the idyllic environment of the Pahartali and Chittagong hills. When the Japanese bombed Chittagong, his father sent them to his village home in Nabinagar, Brahmanbaria. His village home at Meratali stands on the Titas River and his stay in pastoral surrounding nourished his sensibilities. His early education started with his mother, Salema Khatoon, who was the only literate woman in the village. Later a Maulana was hired for the village boys and he always remembers him with profound love and respect.

His family moved to Pahartali and he read in the Pahartali Railway High School in 1947. Next year the family moved to Chittagong and he got himself admitted to Chittagong Collegiate School. Here he read up to class nine and on his father's retirement moved to Brahmanbaria town. He passed his matriculation examination from Annada Model High School in 1955. He got himself admitted to Brahmanbaria College, and passed his Intermediate in Arts examination (1957) under Dhaka University standing 5th in the merit list.

He did his BA honours (1960) and MA (1961) from Dhaka University. He later went to University of Cambridge (Fitzwilliam College), UK and obtained his B A honours (1966) and M A (1970). In the mid-seventies he went to the East West Centre, Hawaii and did his ESOL training which included a visit to the mainland to see some of the important language schools in the States.

Professional career
He started his teaching career as a lecturer at Brahmanbaria College in late 1961. He joined EPJES on 4 February 1962 and started teaching at Islamic Intermediate College (now Kabi Nazrul College). He obtained a government scholarship and proceeded to Cambridge for higher studies. He did his Tripos in English and obtained a B A with honours in 1966. On his return, he was appointed a lecturer at Dhaka College. He was promoted to assistant professor on 6 May 1968. He joined Jinnah College (now Titumir College) and taught there until his selection as a member of the East Pakistan Senior Education Service. He joined Murari Chand College, Sylhet as an associate professor on 3 July 1972. He then resigned his government service and joined Chittagong University as an associate professor on 2 October 1973. He was made a professor of English on 24 July 1981. He taught at the Annaba University, Algeria between 1979 and 1980. He resigned his job at the Chittagong University on 14 May 1985 and joined Jahangirnagar University, on the following day.

During the interregnum of Justice Shahabuddin Ahmed he was appointed Director General of Bangla Academy on 7 February 1991. After a stint of four years he went back to Jahangirnagar University. He went on voluntary retirement in 1998. He took a break from teaching and became the chief editor of Dhaka Courier, a national English-language newsweekly. But his journalistic career was short-lived and he joined North South University as an adjunct professor of English. He taught there for 8 years and terminated his contract in December 2008. He then joined Darul Ihsan University as an adviser and professor of English. He taught at International Islamic University Chittagong at its Dhaka branch until 28 February 2015.

Personal life

Rashid married his cousin Murshida Begum when he was 24. He had two sons and a daughter by her. Murshida died of cancer in 1985. He married Shireen Yasmin Khan in the following year. He has no children by her.

Bangla Academy

His appointment as the director general of the Bangla Academy is a landmark in his career as an educational administrator. This was a challenge which he took with great zeal. At the universities he proved his merit as the provosts of A F Rahman Hall, CU (1980-1982), Shahjalal Hall CU (1983-1985) and M H Hall, JU (1990-1991). But Bangla Academy was a vast field for creative activities of national interest. He insisted on its research activities – chiefly the dictionaries which needed editing and branding. He published the Bangla Academy English–Bengali Dictionary (ed Z R Siddiqui) and devised such marketing policies as made it an instant best seller. The cover design was made by artist and painter Qayyum Chowdhury and all the dictionaries had the same design with change of colour. He commissioned three dictionaries during his tenure and published them. He himself edited one pocket dictionary. The other thing he emphasized was the publication of complete works of literary celebrities including Dr Muhammad Shahidullah, Kaykobad, Farrukh Ahmed and most importantly the complete works of Kazi Nazrul Islam,. During his time, Ananda literary Award was given to Bangla Academy which the Council of the academy politely refused. The Bangla Academy Press bought two brand new Heidelberg Printing machines and it was during his tenure that the Press employees came under government pension scheme.  A new project for young writers 'Tarun Lekhak Prakalpo' was started during his tenure.

President of autonomous bodies and NGO

He was elected the president of World University Service International, Geneva in 1984 at the General Assembly held in Nantes, France. Only two South Asian personalities held this post before him – Dr Zakir Husain, former President of India and Dr I H Qureshi, education minister of Pakistan. He led the delegation of the WUS to the 42nd session of the United Nations Human Rights Commission.

He was elected president of the Asiatic Society of Bangladesh in 1998 for two years. In February 2007, he was made the president of Bangla Academy for two years. He was unanimously elected Chairman of Wild Team (Wild Life Trust of Bangladesh) on 5 August 2015.

Visiting countries on Government invitation

He was invited by the US government to visit some North American universities under the International Visitor's Programme in 1988. When he was president Asiatic Society of Bangladesh, the Government of the Islamic Republic of Iran invited him and two of his colleagues to visit the Encyclopedia programmes of the country in 1999.

Important seminars attended and lectures delivered
 Delivered a lecture on The new poetry of Independence, Protest and Revolution in Bangladesh at the Mississippi Room in the students Center on 15 November 1976 on the invitation of the English and Foreign Languages Department, Southern Illinois University, Carbondale (USA)
 Presented a paper on Socio-economic and political priorities of Asia at the WUS regional conference held in Manila between 23 and 27 October 1985
 Presented a paper on Unity and Diversity: the Sufi Dimension at the World Islamic Conference held in Casablanca, Morocco between 7 and 11 November 1987
 Attended a Cambridge seminar sponsored by the British Council held at Cambridge UK between 10 and 19 July 1991
 Presented a paper on Folk Tradition Modern Literature and the Element of Continuity at a seminar sponsored by the Sahitya Academy held in Kolkata on 25 December 1994
 Attended a seminar on Actualities – British and Islam held between 28 and 30 May 1999 at the Royal Commonwealth Society, London
 Delivered the 46th Foundation Day Lecture of the Bangla Academy on The Crisis of Civilization and the Individual on 3 December 2001
 Delivered a lecture on Dharmer Nandanikata (Aesthetics of Religion) at the invitation of Dev Centre for Philosophical Studies of Dhaka University, 2007
 Delivered a lecture on Amar Amir Itikatha (A Probe into the Self within myself) at the invitation of Centre for Advanced Research in Humanities of Dhaka University, 2007

Encounter with a Sufi Saint
A significant event in his life was his meeting a Sufi saint, Syed Rashid Ahmed Jaunpuri, the maternal grandson of Karamat Ali Jaunpuri, who preached Islam in Bengal and Assam in the 19th century. He accepted him as his murshid. and followed him taking notes of his lectures. He learnt the principles of Sufism sitting at his feet and practiced the basics of Ma'refat without which, the Guru emphasized, Islam could not be seen its wholeness, beauty and excellence. Later the notes came in handy in writing about his teachings. He wrote a total of five books on his lectures which were published during his lifetime. He was with him for 13 years until his passing away in 2001. He published his collected lectures under the title Sanglap Samagra (2003). Nearly 12 years after his Shaykh's death he published a magnum opus Syed Rashid Ahmed Jaunpuri (RA) Smarak Grantha (2013)

Works

Rashid's contribution is primarily on literature, specially on poetry, translation and also on sufism.

As Author
 Bhasha Chintay O Karme tr. (Language in Thought and Action by S I Hayakawa), Bangla Academy, 1968
 Three Poets tr ed (First anthology of Bangladeshi poetry in English translation), Bangladesh Books International, 1976
 Silpakala (Magazine, vol 2) 'Murtaja Baseer: The Odyssey of a Lonely Soul'. M. Harunur Rashid, Shilpakala Academy 1979
 Tinti Farashi Probondha (Three French essays in translation), Bangla Academy, 1984
 A Choice of Contemporary Verse from Bangladesh ed. Bangla Academy,1985
 Shamalochona (Criticism), Bangla Academy, 1985
 Shabder Shilparupa o Annanya Probondha (Art forms of words and other essays), Bangla Academy, 1985
 Eklasuddin Ahmeder Probondha O Patraboli (Essays and letters of Eklasuddin Ahmed), Bangla Academy, 1988
 Machhi M Harunur Rashid, tr. Les Mouches by Jean Paul Sartre, Bishwa Shahitya Kendra, 1991
 A Choice of Verse on Human Rights ed. UNIC, 1993.
 Hawaii Theke Likhchhi (Letters from Hawaii), Samoy Prakashani,1993
 Hazar Bachharer Swapna Bangla Academy, 1994
 Hasan Bayatir Sukh Dukkha tr Last Days of an Artist by Anwar Ridhwan, Bangla Academy, 1994
 Sattyer Prakash ed (messages and epigrams of Syed Rashid Ahmed Jaunpuri). 1994
 A few Youths in the Moon, tr. Chander Aloy Ora Koyekjon by Humayun Ahmed. Samoy Prakashani, 1995
 Shahaj Bangla Avidhan (a concise Bengali dictionary), Bangla Academy. 1995
 Vruner Maa Manusher Allah Ebong Annanya Sanglap, ( Foetus's Mother, Man's Allah and other dialogues),Dhaka 1996
 Niruddesh Nadi Antaheen Sagar Ebang Annanya Sanglap, (The Lost River, the Boundless Sea and other dialogues) Dhaka 1996
 Beduiner Lal Ut Ebang Annanya Sanglap, ( Bedouin's red camel and other dialogues) Dhaka. 1997
 Ichhaheen Ghare Ichhar Basabash Ebang Annanya Sanglap, (Desire in a Desireless Abode and other dialogues), Dhaka 1997
 Jibaner Gandi Mrittur Thikana Ebang Annanya Sanglap, (The Frontiers of Life, the Abode of Death and other dialogues), Dhaka 1998
 From Courage to Courage and Other Poems, ed with introd. Bangla Academy, 1998
 Manav Jatir Asamatar Utsa Ebang Vitti, tr. On the Origin of the inequality of mankind by Jean Jaques Rousseau. Bangla Academy, 1999
 English for Bangali Learners, Bangla Academy, 2000
 The Esoteric on the Canvas, Brochure introducing Murtaja Baseer's painting exhibition, 1-15 Nov 2002 held at Shilpaka Academy.
 Swapner Moroke Ichhar Basabash, (poetry) Anupam Prakashani, 2002
 Sanglap Samagra, (Collected dialogues of Syed Rashid Ahmed Jaunpuri), 2003
 What my name is (A book of verses by Sarker Amin) tr. M Harunur Rashid and Razia Khan Amin, Drupaid, Dhaka 2003
 Dharmer Nandanikata O Annanya Prasanga, Adorn Publication, Dhaka 2008
 All Praise be to Him Sakal Prasangsha Tanr by Abdul Mannan Syed, tr M. Harunur Rashid. Dhaka 2012
 The Story of Bones and Other Poems by Kamal Chowdhury, tr. M. Harunur Rashid. Shamabesh, Dhaka 2012
 Selected Surrealist Poems ed with an introduction (Selections from Surrealist poems by Abdul Mannan Syed), Samabesh 2012
 Syed Rashid Ahmed Jaunpuri (RA) Smarak Grantha ed Pathak Samabesh, Dhaka 2013
 Moments in the Mirror, Vol 1 (selected columns), Samabesh, Dhaka 2014
 Moments in the Mirror, Vol 2 (selected columns), Samabesh, Dhaka 2015
 Syed Rashid Ahmed Jaunpuri (ra) Sufi Tatta Bodhini Kathammrito Sagar (Lectures on Applied Sufi Lessons) by M. Harunur Rashid. Shamabesh. Dhaka 2015
 Mahanabir Jiboner Alaukik Ghotonaboli (Miracles in the Life of the Great Prophet) by M. Harunur Rashid. Shamabesh. Dhaka 2015
 Smritir Rekhachitro: Chera Megher Bhela (Sketches of Memories) by M. Harunur Rashid, Piyal Printing and Publications, Dhaka 2016
 Cambridge: Look Back in Love by M. Harunur Rashid, MetaKave Publications, Dhaka 2016
 Rabia Basri theke MeeraBai translated by M. Harunur Rashid, MetaKave Publications, Dhaka, 2017
 Sex and Spiritual Poems by Sarker Amin, translated by M. Harunur Rashid, Chaitannya, Sylhet, 2017
 Me before me and other poems by M. Harunur Rashid, Pathak Shamabesh, Dhaka, 2020
 English for Bangali Learners by M. Harunur Rashid, New look edition, Bangla Academy, Dhaka, 2022
 Three Poets by M. Harunur Rashid, 3rd enlarged edition, Bangla Academy, Dhaka, 2022
 Bangla Academy Amar Bangla Academy by M. Harunur Rashid, Oitijjhya, Dhaka, 2022
 Hawaii Theke Likhcchi by M. Harunur Rashid, Shamabesh, Dhaka, 2022
 A Straight Pendulum translated by M. Harunur Rashid, selected poems by Shahnaz Munni, Samabesh, Dhaka, 2022
 Behular Sari translated by M. Harunur Rashid, a poetry book by Mohammad Nurul Huda, Samabesh, Dhaka, 2022

Books dedicated to him
 Brahmanbariar Meyeli Geet by Shahnaz Munni, Mangalshandhya, Dhaka, 1990
 Mongol Sandhya, edited by Sarker Amin. Dhrubopada, Dhaka, 2014
 Metamodern and Other Tendencies by Mohammad Nurul Huda. Banglaprokash, Dhaka, 2014
 Adhunikotar Pathe Bangladesh (Bangladesh on the Road to Modernity) by Mohit Ul Alam, V.C. Nazrul University, Mymensingh. Katha Prokash, Dhaka, 2015
 Collected Novels of Humayun Ahmed (Volume 4), Annyaprakash, Dhaka
 Kabbosangraha by Matin Bairagi, Suddhoprakash, Dhaka, 2018
 The General and Other Poems by Habibullah Shirajee, Shamabesh Book, Dhaka, 2019
 Dhaka Shaharer Bhikharider Gaan by Syed Mohammad Shahed, Bengal Publications, Dhaka, 2022

References

1939 births
Living people
Bangladeshi essayists
Bangladeshi male writers
Academic staff of Dhaka College
Bangladeshi educators
Bangladeshi Sufis
Alumni of Fitzwilliam College, Cambridge
Male essayists
Academic staff of Jahangirnagar University
People from Brahmanbaria district